The Jabrids or Banu Jabr were an Arab dynasty that ruled all of Arabia except for Hejaz and Yemen, and expanded into Iran's southern coast, controlling the Strait of Hormuz

Prominence
Their most prominent ruler was Ajwad ibn Zamil, who died in 1507.  He was described by his contemporaries as having been "of Najdi origin."  Ajwad's elder brother had earlier established the dynasty in the early 15th century by deposing and killing the last Jarwanid ruler in Qatif. At their height, the Jabrids controlled the entire Arabian coast on the Persian Gulf, including the islands of Bahrain, and regularly led expeditions into central Arabia and Oman. One contemporary scholar described Ajwad ibn Zamil as "the king of al-Ahsa and Qatif and the leader of the people of Najd."  Following his death, his kingdom was divided among some of his descendants, with Migrin ibn Zamil (possibly his grandson) inheriting al-Hasa, Qatif, and Bahrain.  Migrin fell in battle in Bahrain in a failed attempt to repel an invasion of Bahrain by the Portuguese in 1521.

Fall
The Jabrid kingdom collapsed soon afterwards on the mainland, after an invasion of al-Hasa by Rashid Ibn Mughamis, the chief of Muntafiq Bedouins. One branch of the Jabrids remained active in Oman, however, for nearly another three centuries. It is unknown for sure what became of the non-Omani Jabrids. Some believe they left to Iraq, while others believe they are identical with the Jubur section of the Bani Khalid confederation, who eventually took control of the region after the Jabrids.

See also
 List of Sunni dynasties

References

 
History of Eastern Arabia